Dog Party is an album by guitarist Scott Henderson. A departure from his jazz fusion style, the album explores blues and blues rock, with songs that have something to do with dogs.

Reception

Allmusic gave the album a positive review, praising "Milk Bone", "Hound Dog", and "Hole Diggin'", concluding that the album is "a feast of stylish blues served with grace and feeling."

Track listing

Personnel
 Scott Henderson – guitar
 Stan Martin – trumpet
 Mike Whitman – saxophone
 Scott Kinsey– keyboards
 Pat O'Brien – harmonica
 Richard Ruse – bass guitar
 Kirk Covington – drums and vocals
 Willie Scoggins – guitar solo on "Too Many Gittars"
 Steve Trovato – guitar solo on "Too Many Gittars"
 Keith Wyatt – guitar solo on "Too Many Gittars"
 T. J. Helmerich – guitar solo on "Too Many Gittars"
 Erin McGuire – vocals on "Same as You"
 Linda Zegarelli – harmonica on "Same as You"

References

1994 albums
Scott Henderson albums